Central Christian School may refer to:

Central Christian College of Kansas, evangelical Christian college in McPherson, Kansas, affiliated with the Free Methodist Church
Central Christian College of the Bible in Moberly, Missouri
Central Christian High School (Kidron, Ohio), a Mennonite K-12 school in Ohio
Central Christian School (Hutchinson, Kansas)
Central Christian Schools, Redmond, Oregon